"Some Old Side Road" is a song written by Roger D. Ferris and recorded by American country music artist Keith Whitley. It was released in November 1987 as the second single from the album Don't Close Your Eyes.  The song reached number 16 on the Billboard Hot Country Singles & Tracks chart.

Chart performance

References

1987 singles
1987 songs
Keith Whitley songs
RCA Records singles
Songs written by Roger Ferris